Sir John William Fisher Beaumont, QC, PC (4 September 1877 - 8 February 1974) was the Chief Justice of the Bombay High Court.

Early life
Beaumont was born in St Pancras, London in 1877. His father Edward Beaumont was also Bar-at-law. He was educated at Winchester College and Pembroke College, Cambridge. Beaumont passed B.A. with First Class in 1899 and received a scholarship. In 1901, he was called to the Bar by the Lincoln's Inn.

Career
After Sir Amberson Barrington Marten, Beaumont became the Chief Justice of the Bombay High Court in 1930 and was in office till 1943, thus held that office for the longest period in the history of the High Court. He was knighted in 1931 and was several times called upon to act temporarily as a judge of the Federal Court of India. Beaumont worked there from 1942 to 1943. He was also appointed a member of the Judicial Committee of the Privy Council.

He died in 1974 and was buried on the west side of Highgate Cemetery.

References

1877 births
1974 deaths
Burials at Highgate Cemetery
Knights Bachelor
British India judges
20th-century English judges
Chief Justices of the Bombay High Court
Alumni of Pembroke College, Cambridge
Members of Lincoln's Inn
20th-century Indian judges
English barristers
King's Counsel
People educated at Winchester College
British people in colonial India